Saleaudo is a historic home located at Adamstown, Frederick County, Maryland, United States. It is a two-story brick house built about 1856, with four interior brick chimneys. The house features murals painted by Constantino Brumidi and Filip Castaggini in the entrance hall.

Saleaudo was listed on the National Register of Historic Places in 1979.

References

External links
, including photo in 1984, at Maryland Historical Trust

Houses on the National Register of Historic Places in Maryland
Houses completed in 1866
Houses in Frederick County, Maryland
1866 establishments in Maryland
National Register of Historic Places in Frederick County, Maryland